Habeeb Ahmed (born 7 November 1987) is an Indian first-class cricketer who plays for Hyderabad.

References

External links
 

1987 births
Living people
Indian cricketers
Hyderabad cricketers
Cricketers from Hyderabad, India
Wicket-keepers